Shilu is the Pinyin transcription of several Chinese words and proper names. It may refer to:
 Shilu, Hainan (石碌镇), a town in Hainan Island.
 Shilu, Suzhou (lit. Stone Road, 石路), a business street in Suzhou
 Veritable Records, historical records of Chinese imperial administrations
 Shi Lu (石鲁), Chinese painter
 Shilu (Jurchen) (石魯), Jurchen chieftain in the Liao dynasty

 Shilu Station may refer to 
 Shi Lu station (石路站) of Suzhou Rail Transit.
 Shilu railway station (石碌站) on a branch of Hainan western ring railway, in Shilu, Hainan.